Founded in 1874, Pyrkal (Greek: Πυρκάλ) is one of the oldest defense industries in Greece and the main producer of ammunition and explosives in the country. 
Throughout its history, it has been one of the largest Greek companies, in fact, a reflection of the history of Greek Industry itself. Moreover, since its foundation, it has been a crucial supplier during all the military conflicts the nation faced, and historically a well-established exporter to five continents.

Establishment and development 
The company "Elliniko Pyritidopoieio A.E." (Greek Powder, Chemical, and Industrial products) was founded in 1874, and "Maltsiniotis Brothers" (Cartridges and metal products) in 1887. The merger of the two companies in 1908 was done to overcome an odd competition between the two for ammunition orders by the Greek state. Thus, a new company was formed, named "Etairia (Ellinikou) Pyritidopoieiou kai Kalykopoieiou" with the initials EEPK or EPK (ΕΠΚ) - the acronym Pyrkal used later; internationally it has been known as "Greek Powder and Cartridge Company" (GPCC) in English, and "Poudrerie et Cartoucherie Hellenique" (PCH) in French.

Starting with the production of 6.5×54mm Mannlicher–Schönauer for the Mannlicher–Schönauer, and in addition to ammunition and explosives, the company has been engaged in a variety of additional activities including arms manufacture (which included own development of the advanced EPK machine gun type immediately before Greece's entrance to World War II), construction of machinery (including Diesel engines), vehicle bodies, tools, factory infrastructure, boilers, aircraft (as it undertook constructions for the AEKKEA-RAAB company) etc.

Part of the Bodossakis "empire"; events up to, during and after WWII 

From 1934 the company was controlled by Prodromos Bodosakis-Athanasiadis, one of the most important figures in 20th-century Greek industrial history. Pyrkal eventually became part of a huge industrial empire created by the Bodosakis in Greece and Cyprus, involved in mining operations (with several companies, holding the dominant position in Greece), textiles, chemicals and fertilizers, beverages, glass manufacturing, engineering & construction, as well as services (shipping, insurances etc.).
 

In 1936-37 during the Spanish Civil War German arms were supplied to the Spanish Republicans from Rheinmetall-Borsig, then controlled by Hermann Göring, even though German forces were fighting with the Spanish Nationalists. Arms shipped to Greece with a Greek end-user certificate were split by Bodosakis, with arms for the Republicans transferred to ships supposedly sailing to Mexico. But the Nationalists got the best and latest weapons while the Republicans got the oldest and least serviceable. This supply peaked in 1937-38, with shipments from Rheinmetall-Borsig worth up to 40 million Reichsmarks each. Nationalists identified 18 vessels sent to Republican ports from 3 January 1937 to 11 May 1938 and estimated that Goering received the equivalent of one pound sterling per rifle. In November 1937 Bodosakis traveled to Barcelona in a Soviet aircraft and signed a contract to supply ammunition to the Republic for £2.1 million, in hard currency in advance. There have also been reports that the company assembled airplanes for the nationalist forces.

Pyrkal's production was particularly crucial for Greece up to and during World War II. The company facilities were used by the German forces during Greece's occupation by the Axis (as a planned last-moment transfer of equipment and/or destruction of the company facilities to prevent such usage was not realized). The end of the War found the company in ruins, with equipment and material looted by retreating German forces. The machine works (once called "the largest in the Eastern Mediterranean and the Middle East") were almost completely destroyed. The rebirth of Pyrkal resembles a miracle. The company started producing metal products and consumer items, but it recovered fast to its pre-War status as it benefited greatly from orders by the Hellenic Army, NATO and, ironically, West Germany. The next two decades were a period of prosperity and expansion, with new facilities built and new products developed.

1970s and 1980s: change of fortunes 
The company suffered a serious blow when the Greek state decided to create EBO in 1976, which initially undertook production of the Heckler and Koch G3 rifle adopted by the Greek Army in place of the FN FAL that Pyrkal had already started producing under licence (a number of FN FAL's had originally been bought by the Greek Military from Belgium, and about 30,000 built by Pyrkal were exported to other countries). The development of EBO seriously hurt Pyrkal's performance, as the two companies offered partially overlapping products. Pyrkal was hurt further by the loss of traditional export markets in the 1970s. Other parts of Bodossakis's "empire" also faced problems, and the state finally intervened in the early 1980s. In 1982 Pyrkal, almost bankrupt and a shadow of its former self (but still employing thousands), was nationalized. Ever since, its financial performance has been shaky at best.

New efforts and merger with EBO 
The company has nonetheless invested in diversification and Research & Development, expanding its activities beyond production of a wide range of ammunition types, mines, bombs, fuses for high explosive large caliber ammunition, electronics, etc. to participation in programs like the Stinger missile European post-production program and, as an equal partner, in the development and production of the IRIS-T missile. Moreover, it introduced its own advanced (although controversial) cluster bomb in the early 1990s and constructed Greek-designed modern wind generators in 2002. In a move reflecting one made almost a hundred years earlier, it merged with EBO in 2004, to eliminate the odd competition between the two companies for state orders, forming EAS.

References
Notes

Sources
L.S. Skartsis, "Greek Vehicle & Machine Manufacturers 1800 to present: A Pictorial History", Marathon (2012)  (eBook)
Christos Sazanidis, "Ta opla ton Ellinon (Arms of the Greeks)", Maiandros, Thessaloniki (1995)
"H Elliniki polemiki viomihania prosferetai stous Nazi (Greek Military Industry ends up in Nazi hands)" article in the Imerisia Newspaper, December 15, 2007.
Th. Sfikas, "I Ellada kai o Ispanikos Emfylios Polemos (Greece and the Spanish Civil War)", Stachy, Athens (2000) (report about Pyrkal's involvement)

External links
http://www.eas.gr (material about Pyrkal)

Defence companies of Greece
Firearm manufacturers of Greece
Manufacturing companies based in Athens
Greek companies established in the 19th century
Greek brands